Varney Boakai Sando Jr. (born 5 May 1995) is a Liberian professional footballer who plays as a midfielder for Liberia First Division club Watanga FC (on loan from Ghana Premier League club, Accra Great Olympics) and the Liberia national team.

Club career
In 2020, Sando signed for Ghanaian club Karela United. It was reported in July 2021 that he wanted to terminate his contract with the club. In January 2022, he signed for another club in Ghana, Accra Great Olympics.

International career 
Sando made his first appearance for the Liberia national team in a 1–0 friendly loss to Egypt on 7 November 2019.

Honors 
LISCR FC

 Liberian FA Cup: 2019

References 

1995 births
Living people
Sportspeople from Monrovia
Liberian footballers
Association football midfielders
Sime Darby F.C. players
Emmanuel Stars F.C. players
LISCR FC players
LPRC Oilers players
Karela United FC players
Accra Great Olympics F.C. players
Malaysia Premier League players
Malaysia Super League players
Liberian First Division players
Ghana Premier League players
Liberia international footballers
Liberian expatriate footballers
Expatriate footballers in Malaysia
Expatriate footballers in Ghana
Liberian expatriate sportspeople in Malaysia
Liberian expatriate sportspeople in Ghana